Viktor Bezmen (born 26 November 1961) is a retired Belarusian professional footballer and Belarus international.

He spent the majority of his career (13 years) playing for Lokomotiv-96 Vitebsk (formerly KIM, Dvina, Vityaz) in Soviet Second League and later in Belarusian Premier League. After retirement, he worked at administrative and coaching positions at Ministry of Emergency Situations and later as a youth coach at SDYuSShOR Dvina in Vitebsk.

References

External links
 
 Profile at teams.by

1961 births
Living people
Soviet footballers
Belarusian footballers
FC Vitebsk players
Belarus international footballers
Association football defenders
Sportspeople from Minsk Region